Brand awareness is the extent to which customers are able to recall or recognize a brand under different conditions. Brand awareness is one of two dimensions from brand knowledge, an associative network memory model. Brand awareness is a key consideration in consumer behavior, advertising management, and brand management. The consumer's ability to recognize or recall a brand is central to purchasing decision-making. Purchasing cannot proceed unless a consumer is first aware of a product category and a brand within that category. Awareness does not necessarily mean that the consumer must be able to recall a specific brand name, but they must be able to recall enough distinguishing features for purchasing to proceed. Creating brand awareness is the main step in advertising a new product or bringing back the older brand in light.

Brand awareness consists of two components: brand recall and brand recognition. Several studies have shown that these two components operate in fundamentally different ways as brand recall is associated with memory retrieval, and brand recognition involves object recognition. Both brand recall and brand recognition play an important role in consumers’ purchase decision process and in marketing communications. Brand awareness is closely related to concepts such as the evoked set and consideration set which include the specific brands a consumer considers in purchasing decision. Consumers are believed to hold between three and seven brands in their consideration set across a broad range of product categories. Consumers typically purchase one of the top three brands in their consideration set as consumers have shown to buy only familiar, well-established brands.

As brands are competing in a highly globalized market, brand awareness is a key indicator of a brand's competitive market performance. Given the importance of brand awareness in consumer purchasing decisions, marketers have developed a number of metrics designed to measure brand awareness and other measures of brand health. These metrics are collectively known as Awareness, Attitudes and Usage (AAU) metrics.

To ensure a product or brand's market success, awareness levels must be managed across the entire product life-cycle - from product launch to market decline. Many marketers regularly monitor brand awareness levels, and if they fall below a predetermined threshold, the advertising and promotional effort is intensified until awareness returns to the desired level.

Importance of brand awareness 
Brand awareness is related to the functions of brand identities in consumers’ memory and can be measured by how well the consumers can identify the brand under various conditions. Brand awareness plays an important role in the consumer's purchasing decision-making process. Strong brand awareness can be a predictor of brand success. Brand awareness is strengthened by its brand-related associations such as the consumers’ evaluation of the brand and their perceived quality of the brand. Consequently, brands focus on improving customer satisfaction and invest in advertising to increase consumers’ brand awareness.

Brand awareness is a key indicator of a brand's market performance. Brands competing in a highly globalized market invest in global advertising and distribution to compete for consumers’ attention and awareness. As the capitalism and global transport contribute to consumer behavior, many marketers regularly monitor brand awareness levels. If these levels fall below a predetermined threshold, the advertising and promotional effort is intensified until awareness returns to the desired level. In marketing planning and brand management, it is important to set objectives to promote brand awareness to motivate consumers to purchase a given brand's products.

Brand awareness is one of the major brand assets that adds value to the product, service or company. Investing in building brand awareness can lead to sustainable competitive advantages, thus, leading to long-term value.

Brand Equity 

Brand equity is the sum of assets and liabilities relating to a brand, its name and logo, and the sum or difference is the value that is offered by the product or service or a company or the company's customers. For the assets and liabilities to have effect on brand equity, they have to be related to the name or logo of the brand. If the brand's name or logo changes, then, it can either have a positive or a negative impact on the assets and liabilities of the brand, with some of them getting transferred to the new name and logo. The brand equity stands on the assets and liabilities and it can differ from factor to factor such as, brand loyalty, brand name awareness, how a customer perceives the quality of a brand, and other proprietary assets such as patent and trademark.

Types of brand awareness 
Brand awareness is divided into two components: brand recall (also known as unaided recall or occasionally spontaneous recall) and brand recognition (also known as aided brand recall). These types of awareness operate in entirely different ways with important implications for marketing strategy and advertising.

Brand recall
Brand recall is also known as unaided recall or spontaneous recall and refers to the ability of the consumer to correctly generate a brand from memory when prompted by a product category. When prompted by a product category, most consumers can only recall a relatively small set of brands, typically around 3–5 brand names. In consumer tests, few consumers can recall more than seven brand names within a given category and for low-interest product categories, most consumers can only recall one or two brand names...

Research suggests that the number of brands that consumers can recall is affected by both individual and product factors including; brand loyalty, brand knowledge, situational and usage factors, and education level. For instance, consumers who are highly experienced with a given product category or brand may be able to recall a slightly larger set of brand names than those who are less experienced with a given product category or brand.

Brand recognition

Brand recognition is also known as aided recall and refers to the ability of the consumers to confirm that they have seen or heard of a given brand before. This does not necessarily require that the consumers have to identify the brand name. Instead, it means that consumers can recognize the brand upon presentation, either at the point-of-sale or after viewing its visual packaging.

Top-of-mind awareness
Consumers will normally purchase one of the top three brands in their consideration set. This is known as  
top-of-mind awareness. Consequently, one of the goals for most marketing communications is to increase the probability that consumers will include the brand in their consideration sets.

By definition, top-of-mind awareness is "the first brand that comes to mind when a customer is asked an unprompted question about a category." When discussing top-of-mind awareness among larger groups of consumers (as opposed to a single consumer), it is more often defined as the "most remembered" or "most recalled" brand name(s).

A brand that  enjoys top-of-mind awareness will generally be considered as a genuine purchase option, provided that the consumer is favorably disposed to the brand name.  Top-of-mind awareness is relevant when consumers make a quick choice between competing brands in low-involvement categories or for impulse type purchases.

Marketing implications of brand awareness

Brand awareness is closely related to the concepts of the evoked set (defined as the set of brands that a consumer can elicit from memory when contemplating a purchase) and the consideration set (defined as the “small set of brands which a consumer pays close attention to when making a purchase decision”). One of the central roles of advertising is to create both brand awareness and brand image, in order to increase the likelihood that a brand is included in the consumer's evoked set or consideration set and regarded favorably.

Consumers do not learn about products and brands from advertising alone. When making purchase decisions, consumers acquire information from a wide variety of sources in order to inform their decisions. After searching for information about a category, consumers may become aware of a larger number of brands which collectively are known as the awareness set. Thus, the awareness set is likely to change as consumers acquire new information about brands or products.  A review of empirical studies in this area suggests that the consideration set is likely to be at least three times larger than the evoked set.  Awareness alone is not sufficient to trigger a purchase, consumers also need to be favorably disposed to a brand before it will be considered as a realistic purchase option.

The process of moving consumers from brand awareness and a positive brand attitude through to the actual sale is known as conversion.  While advertising is an excellent tool for creating awareness and brand attitude, it usually requires support from other elements in the marketing program to convert attitudes into actual sales. Other promotional activities, such as telemarketing, are vastly superior to advertising in terms of generating sales. Accordingly, the advertising message might attempt to drive consumers to direct sales call centers as part of an integrated communications strategy. Many different techniques can be used to convert interest into sales including special price offers, special promotional offers, attractive trade-in terms or guarantees.

Percy and Rossiter (1992) argue that the two types of awareness, namely brand recall and brand recognition, operate in fundamentally different ways in the purchase decision. For routine purchases such as fast moving consumer goods (FMCG), few shoppers carry shopping lists. For them, the presentation of brands at the point-of-sale acts as a visual reminder and triggers category need. In this case, brand recognition is the dominant mode of awareness. For other purchases, where the brand is not present, the consumer first experiences category need then searches memory for brands within that category. Many services, such as home help, gardening services, pizza delivery fall into this category. In this case, the category need precedes brand awareness. Such purchases are recall dominant, and the consumer is more likely to select one of the brands elicited from memory. When brand recall is dominant, it is not necessary for consumers to like the advertisement, but they must like the brand. In contrast, consumers should like the ad when brand recognition is the communications objective.

The distinction between brand recall and brand recognition has important implications for advertising strategy. When the communications objectives depend on brand recognition, the creative execution must show the brand packaging or a recognizable brand name. However, when the communications objectives rely on brand recall, the creative execution should encourage strong associations between the category and the brand. Advertisers also use jingles, mnemonics and other devices to encourage brand recall.

Brand dominance occurs when, during brand recall tests, most consumers can name only one brand from a given category. Brand dominance is defined as an individual's selection of only certain brand names in a related category during a brand recall procedure. While brand dominance might appear to be a desirable goal, overall dominance can be a double-edged sword.

A brand name that is well known to the majority of people or households is called a household name and may be an indicator of brand success. Occasionally a brand can become so successful that the brand becomes synonymous with the category. For example, British people often talk about "Hoovering the house" when they actually mean "vacuuming the house." (Hoover is a brand name). When this happens, the brand name is said to have "gone generic."  Examples of brands becoming generic abound; Kleenex, Sellotape, Nescafé, Aspirin and Panadol. When a brand goes generic, it can present a marketing problem because when the consumer requests a named brand at the retail outlet, they may be supplied with a competing brand. For example, if a person enters a bar and requests "a rum and Coke," the bartender may interpret that to mean a "rum and cola-flavoured beverage,"  paving the way for the outlet to supply a cheaper alternative mixer. In such a scenario, The Coca-Cola Company is the ultimate loser because it does not get the sale.

Measuring brand awareness 

Just as different types of brand awareness can be identified, there are a variety of methods for measuring awareness. Typically, researchers use surveys, carried out on a sample of consumers asking about their knowledge of the focus brand or category.

Two types of recall test are used to measure brand awareness:<ref>Hsia, H.J., Mass Communications Research Methods: A Step-by-Step Approach," Routledge"</ref>

Unaided recall tests. where the respondent is presented with a product category and asked to nominate as many brands as possible. Thus, the unaided recall test provides the respondent with no clues or cues. Unaided recall tests are used to test for brand recall.
Aided recall tests, where the respondent is prompted with a brand name and asked whether they have seen it or heard about it. In some aided recall tests, the respondent might also be asked to explain what they know about the brand e.g. to describe package, color, logo or other distinctive features. Aided recall tests are used to test for brand recognition.
In addition, to recall tests, brand research often employs a battery of tests, such as brand association tests, brand attitude, brand image, brand dominance, brand value, brand salience and other measures of brand health. Although these tests do not explicitly measure brand awareness, they provide general measures of brand health and often are used in conjunction with brand recall tests.

To measure brand salience, for example, researchers place products on a shelf in a supermarket, giving each brand equal shelf space. Consumers are shown photographs of the shelf display and ask consumers to name the brands noticed. The speed at which consumers nominate a given brand is an indicator of brand's visual salience. This type of research can provide valuable insights into the effectiveness of packaging design and brand logos.

Metrics used to measure brand effects are collectively termed AAU metrics (Awareness, Attitudes and Usage).

 Brand awareness and the hierarchy of effects 

Brand awareness is a standard feature of a group of models known as hierarchy of effects models. Hierarchical models are linear sequential models built on an assumption that consumers move through a series of cognitive and affective stages, beginning with brand awareness (or category awareness) and culminating in the purchase decision. In these models, advertising and marketing communications operate as an external stimulus and the purchase decision is a consumer response.

A number of hierarchical models can be found in the literature including DAGMAR and AIDA. In a survey of more than 250 papers, Vakratsas and Ambler (1999) found little empirical support for any of the hierarchies of effects. In spite of that, some authors have argued that hierarchical models continue to dominate theory, especially in the area of marketing communications and advertising.

The hierarchy of effects developed by Lavidge in the 1960s is one of the original hierarchical models. It proposes that customers progress through a sequence of six stages from brand awareness through to the purchase of a product:
 Stage 1:   Awareness  -  The consumer becomes aware of a category, product or brand (usually through advertising)
 ↓
 Stage 2:   Knowledge  -  The consumer learns about the brand (e.g. sizes, colors, prices, availability etc.)
 ↓
 Stage 3:   Liking -      The consumer develops a favorable/unfavorable disposition towards the brand
 ↓
 Stage 4:   Preference  - The consumer begins to rate one brand above other comparable brands
 ↓
 Stage 5:   Conviction -  The consumer demonstrates a desire to purchase (via inspection, sampling, trial)
 ↓
 Stage 6:   Purchase  -   The consumer acquires the product

Hierarchical models have been widely adapted and many variations can be found, however, all follow the basic sequence which includes Cognition (C)- Affect (A) - Behavior (B) and for this reason, they are sometimes known as C-A-B models. Some of the more recent adaptations are designed to accommodate the consumer's digital media habits and opportunities for social influence.

Selected alternative hierarchical models follow:

 Basic AIDA model: Awareness→ Interest→ Desire→ Action E. St Elmo Lewis, Financial Advertising. (The History of Advertising), USA, Levey Brothers, 1908

 Modified AIDA model: Awareness→ Interest→ Conviction →Desire→ Action 

 AIDAS Model: Attention → Interest → Desire → Action → Satisfaction 

 AISDALSLove model: Awareness→ Interest→ Search →Desire→ Action → Like/dislike→ Share → Love/ Hate 

 Lavidge et al's Hierarchy of Effects: Awareness→ Knowledge→ Liking→ Preference→ Conviction→ Purchase

 DAGMAR Model: Awareness → Comprehension → Attitude/ Conviction → Action  

 Rossiter and Percy's communications effects: Category Need → Brand Awareness → Brand Preference (Ab) → Purchase Intent→ Purchase Facilitation 

Marketing Implications of hierarchical models

It should be evident that brand awareness constitutes just one of six stages that outline the typical consumer's progress towards a purchase decision. While awareness is a necessary precondition for a purchase, awareness alone cannot guarantee the ultimate purchase. Consumers may be aware of a brand, but for different reasons, may not like it or may fail to develop a preference for that brand. Hence, brand awareness is an indicator of sales performance, but does not account for all sales performance.  For these reasons, marketers use a variety of metrics, including cognitive, affective and behavioral variables, to monitor a brand's market performance.

As consumers move through the hierarchy of effects (awareness→ knowledge→ liking→ preference→ conviction→ purchase), they rely on different sources of information to learn about brands.  While main media advertising is useful for creating awareness, its capacity to convey long or complex messages is limited. In order to acquire more detailed knowledge about a brand, consumers rely on different sources such as product reviews, expert opinion, word-of-mouth referrals and brand/ corporate websites. As consumers move closer to the actual purchase, they begin to rely on more personal sources of information such as recommendations from friends and relatives or the advice of sales representatives. For example, the opinion of an influential blogger might be enough to shore up preference/conviction while a salesperson might be necessary to close the actual purchase.

All hierarchical models indicate that brand awareness is a necessary precondition to brand attitude or brand liking, which serves to underscore the importance of creating high levels of awareness as early as possible in a product or brand life-cycle. Hierarchical models provide marketers and advertisers with basic insights about the nature of the target audience, the optimal message and media strategy indicated at different junctures throughout a product's life cycle. For new products, the main advertising objective should be to create awareness with a broad cross-section of the potential market. When the desired levels of awareness have been attained, the advertising effort should shift to stimulating interest, desire or conviction. The number of potential purchasers decreases as the product moves through the natural sales cycle in an effect likened to a funnel. Later in the cycle, and as the number of prospects becomes smaller, the marketer can employ more tightly targeted promotions such as personal selling, direct mail and email directed at those individuals or sub-segments likely to exhibit a genuine interest in the product or brand.

 Creating and maintaining brand awareness 

Brand advertising can increase the probability that a consumer will include a given brand in his or her consideration set. Brand-related advertising expenditure has a positive effect on brand awareness levels. Virtually anything that exposes consumers to a brand increases brand awareness. “Repeat brand exposure in stores improves consumers' ability to recognize and recall the brand.” Increased exposure to brand advertising can increase consumer awareness and facilitate consumer processing of the included information, and by doing this it can heighten consumers brand recall and attitude towards the brand.

To increase the probability of a product's acceptance by the market, it is important to create high levels of brand awareness as early as practical in a product or brand's life-cycle. To achieve top-of-mind awareness, marketers have traditionally, relied on intensive advertising campaigns, especially at the time of a product launch. To be successful, an intensive campaign utilizes both broad reach (expose more people to the message) and high frequency (expose people multiple times to the message). Advertising, especially main media advertising, was seen as the most cost efficient means of reaching large audiences with the relatively high frequency needed to create high awareness levels. Nevertheless, intensive advertising campaigns can become very expensive and can rarely be sustained for long periods.
Alhaddad (2015) indicates that advertising awareness plays as a good source of meaning and identity for a brand by enhance brand awareness and brand image in social media 

As new products enter the market growth stage, the number of competitors tends to increase with implications for market share. Marketers may need to maintain awareness at some predetermined level to ensure steady sales and stable market share. Marketers often rely on rough and ready 'rules-of-thumb' to estimate the amount of advertising expenditure required to achieve a given level of awareness. For instance, it was often held that to increase brand awareness by just one per cent, it was necessary to double the dollars spent on advertising.

When a brand becomes established and attains the desired awareness levels (typically outlined in the marketing plan), the brand advertiser will shift from an intensive advertising campaign to a reminder campaign. The objective of a reminder campaign is simply to keep target audiences aware of the brand's existence and to introduce new life into the brand offer. A reminder campaign typically maintains broad reach, but with reduced frequency and as a consequence is a less expensive advertising option. Reminder advertising is used by established brands, often when they are entering the maturity stage of the product lifecycle.'' In the decline stage, marketers often shift to a caretaker or maintenance program where advertising expenditure is cut back.

While advertising remains important for creating awareness, a number of changes in the media landscape and to consumer media habits have reduced the reliance on main media advertising. Instead, marketers are seeking to place their brand messages across a much wider variety of platforms. An increasing amount of consumer time and attention is devoted to digital communications devices—from computers and tablets through to cellphones. It is now possible to engage with consumers in a more cost efficient manner using platforms such as social media networks that command massive audiences. For example, Facebook has become an extremely important communications channel. Moreover, social media channels allow for two-way, interactive communications that are not paralleled by traditional main media. Interactive communications provide more opportunities for brands to connect with audience members and to move beyond simple awareness, facilitating brand preference, brand conviction and ultimately brand loyalty.

The rise of social media networks has increased the opportunities for opinion leaders to play a role in brand awareness. In theory, anyone can be an opinion leader e.g. celebrities, journalists or public figures, but the rise of the digital environment has changed our understanding of who is a potentially useful influencer. Indeed, the digital environment has created more opportunities for bloggers to become important influencers because they are seen as accessible, authentic and tend to have loyal followings. Bloggers have become key influencers in important consumer goods and services including fashion, consumer electronics, food and beverage, cooking, restaurant dining and bars. For example, a survey by Collective Bias showed that when it comes to product endorsements digital influencers are more popular than celebrities. Findings showed that only 3% of participants said they would consider buying a celebrity-endorsed item, in comparison to 60% who said they had been influenced by a blog review or social media post when shopping. For marketers, the digital landscape has made it somewhat easier to identify social influencers.

Popular examples of brand advertising and promotion
The following examples illustrate how brand awareness and brand advertising are used in practice.

Coca-Cola "Share a Coke" campaign

Coca-Cola is a well-established brand with a long history and one that has achieved market dominance. For any brand, such as Coke, that controls some 70 percent of market share, there are relatively few opportunities to enlist new customers. Yet Coca-Cola is always on the lookout for novel communications that not only maintain its brand awareness, but that bring the brand to the attention of new audiences. The company launched a campaign which became known as "Share a Coke", with the campaign objectives; "to strengthen the brand’s bond with Australia’s young adults – and inspire shared moments of happiness in the real and virtual worlds." The campaign, originally launched in Australia, became so successful that it was subsequently rolled out to other countries.

The concept was to introduce personalized Coke bottles or cans. Popular names were written in a 'look-alike Spencerian script' which is part of the Coke brand's distinctive brand identity. The campaign organisers seeded social media by targeting "opinion leaders and influencers to get them to […] lead the conversation and encourage others to seek out 'Share a Coke' for themselves". Within days celebrities and others with no connection to Coke were spreading the concept across social networks. The campaign extended the audience reach as more people were exposed to the messages. According to Coke's creative team, "That [Australian] summer, Coke sold more than 250 million named bottles and cans in a nation of just under 23 million people". This campaign helped Coke extend its awareness across a broader age profile as they interacted with each customer on a personal level.

Ronald McDonald and other anthropomorphic brand characters

Consumers experience few difficulties assigning a personality to a brand and marketing communications often encourage consumers to think about brands as possessing human characteristics. When brands are infused with human-like characteristics, it can assist in communicating a brand's values and creating distinctive brand identities that serve to differentiate an offering from competing brands. "In an increasingly competitive marketplace, [some] companies rely on brand characters to create awareness, convey key product/service attributes or benefits, and attract consumers" (Keller, 2003).

The use of anthropomorphic characters has a long history. For example, the Michelin man, employed as a memorable character to sell Michelin car tires, was introduced as early as 1894. These characters benefit the brand by creating memorable images in the consumer's mind while conveying meanings that are consistent with the brand's values.

McDonald's created a similar anthropomorphic brand character known as Ronald McDonald as part of its brand identity. For younger consumers, Ronald McDonald injects a sense of fun and mystery into the McDonald's brand. For parents, the character clearly signals that McDonald's is a family friendly venue. Characters help to carry the brand's identity and can be seen as non-human "spokes-character", contributing to a strong brand differentiation. The likeability of the brands character can "positively influence attitudes towards the brand and increase [consumers'] purchase intention"

Mini
British automotive manufacturer Mini investigated its brand perception in the UK by carrying out 55 in-depth interview designed to elicit key feedback about the brand's values. Consumers felt that the symbolic elements which represented the brand were that it was "fun, stylish and sporty image".

Customer engagement with the Mini brand on a Facebook fan-page, promoted "positive effects on consumers’ brand awareness, through WOM activities and the purchase intention was achieved". The brand, therefore, connected with users at an emotional level.

See also 

 Advertising management - creating brand awareness is the primary function of advertising
 Attitude-toward-the-ad models
 Brand - creating and maintaining high levels of brand awareness is one of the primary functions of brand management
 Consumer behaviour - detailed overview of how consumers move from awareness through to the actual purchase
 Marketing management
 Product life-cycle management (marketing) - explains how levels of brand awareness change over a product's life cycle
 Purchase funnel  - explains how brand awareness changes as different segments of the market begin to adopt a product or brand

References 

Brand management
Branding terminology